It's Great to Be Young may refer to:
 It's Great to Be Young (1946 film)
 It's Great to Be Young (1956 film)
 It's Great to Be Young (album), an album by James Young
 It's Great to Be Young or Waga ya wa tanoshi (我が家は楽し), a film with a score by Toshiro Mayuzumi

See also 
 It's Great to Be Young and in Love, a compilation of recordings by Doc Pomus
 It's Great to Be Alive (disambiguation)